Joshua Lee "Josh" Grajczonek (born 5 February 1990) is a former motorcycle speedway rider from Australia.

Career
Born in Townsville, Queensland, Grajczonek's big break in British Speedway came as an 18-year-old with the Glasgow Tigers. During 4 years with the team he won his first major trophy as a Speedway rider, the 2011 Premier League. For the majority of his time in Britain he has 'doubled-up' riding for a team in both the Elite League and the Premier League. After spells with both the Belle Vue Aces and the Swindon Robins in the Elite League, Grajczonek experienced two successful years riding for the Poole Pirates. In two full seasons with the team he won the Elite League on both occasions. Despite being a part of such a successful period with the club he was initially left out of the teams plans for the 2015 season and it looked as though he would be left without an Elite League club for the 2015 season. However, after an unfortunate injury to fellow Australian Davey Watt shortly before the start of the season Poole turned to Grajczonek and drafted him in as a temporary replacement.

Grajczonek is a six time Queensland Solo Champion, winning the title in 2009, 2011, 2012, 2013, 2014 and 2015.

In 2018 and 2019 he rode for Poole once again in the SGB Premiership.

World Championship Appearances

Speedway World Cup
 2016 –  Manchester, National Speedway Stadium – 4th – 22pts (0)

References

1990 births
Living people
Australian motorcycle racers
Belle Vue Aces riders
Glasgow Tigers riders
Poole Pirates riders
Somerset Rebels riders
Swindon Robins riders
Workington Comets riders